Sweden selected their representative for the Eurovision Song Contest 1979 in a show called Melodifestivalen 1979. The winner was the popular pop singer Ted Gärdestad with the song "Satellit", which he composed, while the lyrics were by his brother, Kenneth Gärdestad.

Before Eurovision

Melodifestivalen 1979 
Melodifestivalen 1979 was the selection for the 19th song to represent Sweden at the Eurovision Song Contest. It was the 18th time that this system of picking a song had been used. 452 songs were submitted to SVT for the competition. The final was held in the Cirkus in Stockholm on 17 February 1979, presented by Ulf Elfving and was broadcast on TV1 but was not broadcast on radio.

Voting

At Eurovision
The contest was held in Jerusalem, and Sweden performed 15th. Gärdestad finished only 17th out of 19, with 8 points.

Voting

References

External links
TV broadcastings at SVT's open archive

1979
Countries in the Eurovision Song Contest 1979
1979
Eurovision
Eurovision